This is a list of spouses of the president of Germany and chancellor.

Spouses of the heads of state since 1919

German Reich (1919–1945)

German Democratic Republic (East Germany, 1949–1990)

Federal Republic of Germany (1949–present)

Spouses of the heads of government

German Reich (1871–1945)

German Democratic Republic (East Germany, 1949–1990)

Federal Republic of Germany (1949–present)

References 

Germany